Theresa E. Randle (born December 27, 1964) is an American actress. She has appeared in films such as Malcolm X (1992), Sugar Hill, Beverly Hills Cop III (both 1994), Girl 6, Space Jam (both 1996), Spawn (1997) and the Bad Boys franchise (1995–2020).

Life and career

Randle was born in Atlanta, Georgia. She began her performing career by studying dance (traditional, modern, jazz) and comedy. She entered Beverly Hills High School with a special program for the exceptionally gifted. At the end of college, she earned her first role at the Los Angeles Inner City Cultural Center and was seen in commercials. She was also involved in acting on the stage. Theatrical roles include In Command of the Children, Sonata, 6 Parts of Musical Broadway, and Fight the Good Fight.

In 1983, she appeared in a George Clinton video, "Last Dance". In 1987, she got her first big-screen break with Maid to Order. For the next three years, she appeared in small roles in films such as Easy Wheels and Heart Condition (1990), with Denzel Washington. She continued in small roles by directors like Abel Ferrara (King of New York [1990]) and Spike Lee (Jungle Fever [1991] and Malcolm X [1992]). Randle also starred with Wesley Snipes in the film Sugar Hill (1994) and also appeared with Eddie Murphy in Beverly Hills Cop III in the same year. She co-starred in CB4 (1993) with Chris Rock, and Bad Boys (1995) with Will Smith and Martin Lawrence, later reprising in the sequels Bad Boys II and Bad Boys for Life. In 1996, she earned her first starring role in Spike Lee's film Girl 6, playing a young out-of-work actress who gets caught up in the seductive yet dark world of phone sex, a subject that's far different from what Spike Lee normally explores in his films. It is often regarded as Lee's most maligned and underappreciated film  both critically and commercially as it grossed a dismal $4.9 million on a $12 million budget, and is Randle's only leading role to date. Later that year she appeared in Space Jam (1996) with Michael Jordan and the film adaptation of the comic book Spawn in 1997.

After 1997, Randle's career cooled considerably and her roles (mostly television projects) became more sporadic. Her next project was not until the year 2000 when she portrayed singer Natalie Cole in Livin' for Love: The Natalie Cole Story. In 2006, Randle played Marine Capt. Amy Jennings in the two Eagle One movies. She later had a role in Shit Year, released in 2010. After 1997's Spawn, Randle's only theatrical releases were 2003's Bad Boys II and 2020's Bad Boys for Life, which was her first project (theatrical or televised) in ten years.

During her time making movies, Randle also made guest appearances on various television sitcoms and dramas. In 1989, she had a guest starring role in A Different World, followed by a minor role in "The Apartment", an episode of the hit television sitcom Seinfeld two years later.  In 2006, Randle signed on to play Patricia Kent on Law & Order: Criminal Intent, replacing Courtney B. Vance as the assistant district attorney assigned to the Major Case Squad, but only appeared in two episodes. In 2007, Randle was a regular cast member of the Lifetime show State of Mind as Dr. Cordelia Banks.

Filmography

Film

Television

Awards and nominations

References

External links

More Changes for Criminal Intent

1964 births
Actresses from Los Angeles
Actresses from Gary, Indiana
Living people
American television actresses
African-American actresses
American film actresses
American stage actresses
20th-century American actresses
21st-century American actresses
20th-century African-American women
20th-century African-American people
21st-century African-American women
21st-century African-American people